Anna Kasprzak (born 8 December 1989) is a Danish dressage rider. She represented Denmark at two Summer Olympics (in 2012 and 2016). Her best Olympic result came in 2012 when she placed 4th with a Danish team in the team competition. Meanwhile, her best individual Olympic result is 14th place achieved in 2016.

Kasprzak represented Denmark at 2014 World Equestrian Games held in Normandy, France and at two European Dressage Championships (in 2013 and 2015). She finished 4th with Danish team at the 2013 Europeans held in Herning, Denmark. She also competed at two editions of Dressage World Cup finals (in 2013 and 2016), where she finished 8th and 5th, respectively.

Kasprzak won multiple medals (one silver and six bronze) at various European junior and young riders championships.

Her mother Hanni Toosbuy Kasprzak is the owner and CEO  of the Danish shoe brand ECCO.

References

External links
 

Living people
1989 births
Danish female equestrians
Olympic equestrians of Denmark
Equestrians at the 2012 Summer Olympics
Equestrians at the 2016 Summer Olympics